Traveller Book 0: An Introduction to Traveller is a tabletop role-playing game supplement, written by Loren K. Wiseman for Traveller, and published by Game Designers' Workshop (GDW) in 1981. The 32-page book acts as an introduction to Traveller, and is designed to be read by those who are new to the hobby of role-playing in general and Traveller in particular. 

An updated edition written by Gareth Hanrahan, was published by Mongoose Publishing in 2008, and released as part of Free RPG Day.

Contents
It includes basic information on character creation, skills, combat, and equipment. A blank character sheet is also included as a sample.

Reception
In the October 1981 edition of The Space Gamer Issue No. 44), William A. Barton thought the book was a good idea for new players, saying, "If you're new to Traveller, you'll find this book a useful aid.  If not, it probably won't be worth your time and money to buy – unless you're a completist."

See also

References

Role-playing game supplements introduced in 1981
Traveller (role-playing game) supplements